Armira Glacier is a  long glacier on Smith Island in the South Shetland Islands, Antarctica draining the southeast slopes of Imeon Range southeast of Slaveykov Peak and east of Neofit Peak.  It is situated southwest of Dragoman Glacier and northeast of Gramada Glacier, and flows southeastward into Yarebitsa Cove on Osmar Strait.  Bulgarian early mapping in 2009.  The glacier is named after Armira River in southeastern Bulgaria.

See also
 List of glaciers in the Antarctic
 Glaciology

Maps
Chart of South Shetland including Coronation Island, &c. from the exploration of the sloop Dove in the years 1821 and 1822 by George Powell Commander of the same. Scale ca. 1:200000. London: Laurie, 1822.
  L.L. Ivanov. Antarctica: Livingston Island and Greenwich, Robert, Snow and Smith Islands. Scale 1:120000 topographic map. Troyan: Manfred Wörner Foundation, 2010.  (First edition 2009. )
 South Shetland Islands: Smith and Low Islands. Scale 1:150000 topographic map No. 13677. British Antarctic Survey, 2009.
 Antarctic Digital Database (ADD). Scale 1:250000 topographic map of Antarctica. Scientific Committee on Antarctic Research (SCAR). Since 1993, regularly upgraded and updated.
 L.L. Ivanov. Antarctica: Livingston Island and Smith Island. Scale 1:100000 topographic map. Manfred Wörner Foundation, 2017.

References

External links
 Armira Glacier. SCAR Composite Antarctic Gazetteer
 Bulgarian Antarctic Gazetteer. Antarctic Place-names Commission. (details in Bulgarian, basic data in English)

External links
 Armira Glacier. Copernix satellite image

Glaciers of Smith Island (South Shetland Islands)
Bulgaria and the Antarctic